The Villigen Formation is a Jurassic geologic formation in Switzerland. Dinosaur remains are among the fossils that have been recovered from the formation, although none have yet been referred to a specific genus.

See also 
 List of dinosaur-bearing rock formations
 List of stratigraphic units with indeterminate dinosaur fossils

References

Bibliography 
  

Geologic formations of Switzerland
Jurassic System of Europe
Jurassic Switzerland
Oxfordian Stage
Paleontology in Switzerland